Jonas Cabungcal Cortes (born July 20, 1966) is a Filipino politician serving as the Mayor of Mandaue City since 2019, a position he previously held from 2007 to 2016. He previously served as representative of the sixth district of Cebu from 2016 to 2019.

Personal life
Cortes  is the thirteenth child of the former mayor of Mandaue Demetrio Cortes Sr. and Celestina Alimpangog Cabungcal. He is of Filipino, Spanish and Chinese ancestry. He was born and raised in Centro, Mandaue. Cortes attended St. Joseph's Academy for grade school in 1972-78 and in St Louis School of Mandaue for high school on 1978-82 both in Mandaue. He graduated from Visayas State College of Agriculture in 1987 with a Bachelor of Science degree in Animal Husbandry. He married Sarah Lea Walker, a Filipino-American on August 14, 1999, with whom he has two children, Dmitri and Mikyla.

Political Issues
During the 2019 Elections, then City Mayor Gabriel Luis Quisumbing (2016-2019) filed cases against Jonas Cortes thru "tax payers" in an alleged plunder and graft case including several former city officials involving a signed deed of absolute sale between EC Ouano Development and Management Corp. (Ecodemcor), a company owned by Olga Ouano in September 2015 for the 35,821-square-meter property, which was sold at a recorded price of P50 per sq/m, which turned out to be just part of the purchase price as there was also a donation of several properties in consideration of the said sale. In fact, the whole case turned out to be a political move by Cortes' rival Quisumbing, in order to put him at a disadvantage as a part of his campaign propaganda strategy.

Another lease contract entered into by the Cortes administration was also found to be questionable because this lacked city council ratification.

The contract involved the lease of 14,408 square meters of lot located at the North Reclamation Area (NRA) to Katumanan Hardware Inc. in 2007.

Katumanan Hardware Inc. had reportedly authorized the sub-lease of the property to Cenore Corporation even in the absence of Council approval. However, this was readily refuted by Cortes who argued that the right to sublease is already part of the authority granted to the lessee in the contract of lease with the City. This issue was again raised by the former Quisumbing's political campaign team against former Mayor Cortes as part of his propaganda strategy during the 2019 elections.

2007 Election

Cortes filed his COC as an independent and ran against  former Mandaue City Mayor Teddy Ouano's son Jonkie Ouano, Cortes was elected mayor.

2010 Election
Cortes won a second term as mayor in 2010 when he received 59.54% of the votes, and also carried his party to win a majority of the seats on the city council after he defeated in a landslide victory former 6th district representative Nerissa Soon Ruiz and her slate.

2019 Election

In an unprecedented move, Jonas Cortes, together with Lolypop Ouano-Dizon made a strategic alliance as Mayoral and Congressional Candidates respectively. Cortes with the support of Thadeo Ouano's descendants formed the Cortes-Ouano alliance supported by PDP-Laban and the regional party One Cebu, with the blessings of the Norberto Quisumbing. Quisumbing junked his grandson Luigi Quisumbing's bid in favor of Jonas Cortes.

During the 2019 election, Jonas Cortes was re-elected as Mayor of Mandaue City, with landslide victory in all the City Council seats against Luigi Quisumbing's Hugpong Mandaue. Lolypop Ouano Dizon won a landslide majority as sixth district representative at the House of Representative. Jonkie Ouano was also elected as Provincial Board Member of Cebu Province.

Economic Boom
Cortes highlighted the P45.6-million increase in the income of the city government from the time he assumed office in July last year, saying he has worked to make the city business-friendly.

Bringing back clean governance in Mandaue City, said Cortes, was his best achievement in his first year in office.

He campaigned on a platform that included government reform and integrity.

References

External links
 

Living people
1966 births
People from Mandaue
Lakas–CMD (1991) politicians
Liberal Party (Philippines) politicians
Members of the House of Representatives of the Philippines from Cebu
Mayors of Mandaue
Filipino Roman Catholics
Filipino city and municipal councilors